Cleo Nicki Maletis (March 11, 1925 - November 9, 2009) was a Canadian-born American beauty pageant titleholder. She was crowned the 19th Ms. America in the Ms. America Pageant of 1956.

Life and family 
Maletis was born in Saskatoon, Saskatchewan, Canada to Greek immigrant parents Thomas and Pagoula "Peggy" Michas and grew up in Vancouver, British Columbia, Canada.  She went on to receive her B.A. from the University of Washington in home economics, graduating in 1946. One year later on June 28, 1947 Cleo was married to Chris C. Maletis, Jr. in Vancouver. After becoming a U.S. citizen, the couple moved to Portland, Oregon, where her husband had grown up. She became the mother of four boys: Chris Maletis, III (born 1948), Tom Maletis (born 1951), Ed Maletis (born 1954), and Rob Maletis (born 1957).

While pregnant with her youngest son Rob, she became "Mrs. America 1957" while visiting numerous European countries as an honorary ambassador. During this time, Maletis became interested in the growing trend of working mothers in Denmark, praising the Danish nurseries that allowed for both parents to work; a trend not yet realized for 1957 suburban Portland. After retiring her crown to Linwood Findley, Maletis went to work for her husband's family beverage distributing business, Maletis, Inc., which in 1993 became Maletis Beverage and Columbia Distributing, the former now run by son Rob Maletis and latter by son Ed Maletis.

Death

Maletis suffered from Alzheimer's disease since 2002 and died on November 9, 2009, in Portland, Oregon surrounded by her family. She had four sons.

References

1925 births
American beauty pageant winners
American people of Greek descent
Canadian women philanthropists
Canadian philanthropists
Philanthropists from Oregon
People from Portland, Oregon
2009 deaths
Mrs. America (contest) delegates
People from Saskatoon
20th-century American philanthropists
University of Washington alumni
Canadian emigrants to the United States
American women philanthropists
Canadian people of Greek descent
People with acquired American citizenship
Neurological disease deaths in Oregon
Deaths from Alzheimer's disease
20th-century women philanthropists